This is a complete list of ice hockey players who have played for the Minnesota Wild in the National Hockey League (NHL). It includes players that have played at least one regular season or playoff game for the Minnesota Wild since the franchise was established in 2000 as one of two expansion teams, along with the Columbus Blue Jackets.

As of August 21, 2013, 15 goaltenders and 173 skaters (forwards and defensemen) have appeared in at least one regular-season and/or playoff game with the Minnesota Wild since the team joined the League in the 2000–01 season.

The "Seasons" column lists the first year of the season of the player's first game and the last year of the season of the player's last game. For example, a player who played one game in the 2006–07 season would be listed as playing with the team from 2006 to 2007, regardless of what calendar year the game occurred within.

Key
 Appeared in a Wild game during the 2020–2021 season.

Note: Stats are updated through to the end of the 2020-2021 season

Goaltenders

Skaters

Notes

References

 
 
 

 
Minnesota Wild players
players